Hank Snow's Souvenirs is a compilation album by country music singer Hank Snow. It was released in 1961 by RCA Victor (catalog LPM-2285). It was produced by Chet Atkins.

In Billboard magazine's annual poll of country and western disc jockeys, it was ranked No. 3 among the "Favorite Country Music Albums" of 1961.

Track listing
Side A
 "The Rhumba Boogie"
 "I'm Moving On"
 "(Now and Then There's) A Fool Such as I"
 "The Golden Rocket"
 "I Don't Hurt Anymore"
 "Music Makin' Mama from Memphis"

Side B
 "With This Ring I Thee Wed"
 "Conscience I'm Guilty" 
 "Bluebird Island"
 "Marriage Vow"
 "These Hands"
 "My Mother"

References

1961 albums
Hank Snow albums
RCA Victor albums